Amoss is a surname. Notable people with the surname include:

 David Amoss, American tobacco farmer
 Jim Amoss (born 1947), American journalist, former editor of The Times-Picayune
 Thomas M. Amoss (born 1961), American thoroughbred horse trainer
 Ulius Louis Amoss (1895–1961), American intelligence officer
 William H. Amoss (1936–1997), American politician

See also
 James M. Amoss Building, a historic commercial building in Wabash, Indiana, United States